Profugus Mortis is the second album by Canadian melodic death metal band Blackguard. This is their first release under the name "Blackguard", and it uses their old band name "Profugus Mortis" as the album title. This is also their last album to have a very strong folk metal influence since they have gotten into a more power metal sound. Paul Ablaze uses the term Epic Metal when he describes the genre of Blackguard as a whole. It combines the elements of folk, symphonic, power, black, and death metal to create the "Epic Metal" sound that they produce.  Capitalizing on the best moments offered up on So It Begins, the new album is a folk metal onslaught that redefines the genre and raises the bar to an all-time high.

Track listing

Personnel
Blackguard
Paul "Ablaze" Zinay – lead vocals
Kim Gosselin – lead guitar
Terry "Roadcase" Deschenes – rhythm guitar
Étienne Mailloux – bass guitar
Jonathan Lefrancois-Leduc – keyboards, synthesizers, orchestrations
Justine "Juice" Ethier – drums

Additional
Jacques Jr. Gélinas – orchestrations on "Scarlet to Snow"
Ophélie Gingras – orchestrations on "Scarlet to Snow"
Alissa White-Gluz – vocals on "The Sword"

See also
 Jean-François Dagenais
 Chasse-galerie
 Sumerian Records discography

References

External links 
AllMusic entry
Discogs entry

2009 debut albums
Blackguard (band) albums